The Northeastern Himalayan subalpine conifer forests are a temperate coniferous forests ecoregion of the middle to upper elevations of the eastern Himalayas and southeast Tibetan Plateau. The ecoregion occurs in southeastern Tibet Autonomous Region, China, in northern and eastern Arunachal Pradesh, India, and extreme eastern Bhutan.

Setting
The forests are mostly in the Yarlung Tsangpo Grand Canyon, where the Yarlung Tsangpo River wraps around the eastern edge of the Himalayas and descends from the Tibetan Plateau. Tributary valleys of the Yarlung Tsangpo, including those of the Nyang River and Parlung Tsangpo, host connected portions of the Northeast Himalayan subalpine conifer forests. Isolated pockets of this ecoregion also occur in the Zayü River valley and Tawang Valley. Many of these forests are found in so-called "inner valleys", which are valleys that are shielded from the South Asian monsoon by mountain ridges but still receive enough precipitation to support thriving forests.

In higher elevations, this ecoregion grades into Eastern Himalayan alpine shrub and meadows and Southeast Tibet shrub and meadows. In lower elevations it grades into Eastern Himalayan broadleaf forests.

Flora
The dominant trees are Tsuga dumosa, Picea smithiana, and Abies spp. Less common are Larix griffithiana, Larix potaninii, Pinus wallichiana, and Taxus baccata. Near timberline are found various junipers: Juniperus indica, Juniperus recurva, and Juniperus squamata. Betula utilis is often found with the conifers. Other broadleaf plants include Acer spp., Magnolia spp., Sorbus spp., Viburnum spp., Lauraceae, and Araliaceae.  Rhododendrons reach their pinnacle in this ecoregion. The number of rhododendron species seems to increase above , and the Yarlung Tsangpo River gorge alone may harbor over 60 of them.

Fauna
Important mammals in this ecoregion include the red panda, takin, musk deer, red goral, Asiatic black bear, and leopard. 

Significant birds include the Tibetan eared-pheasant, white-eared pheasant, and the giant babax.

Conservation
This ecoregion tends to be found on steep, inaccessible terrain and thus has avoided significant human settlement.

References

External links
 

Temperate coniferous forests
Ecoregions of the Himalayas
Himalayan forests
Ecoregions of India
Ecoregions of China
Ecoregions of Bhutan
Biota of Bhutan
Biota of India
Palearctic ecoregions
Northeast India
Montane forests